Saxophone Supremacy is an album by saxophonist Sonny Stitt recorded in 1959 and released on the Verve label.

Reception

Ken Dryden for AllMusic stated, "Sonny Stitt had a difficult time coming out from under the shadow of Charlie Parker, even though Stitt's approach to playing the alto sax was only partially similar to the late giant".

Track listing 
All compositions by Sonny Stitt, except as indicated.
 "I Cover The Waterfront" (Edward Heyman, Johnny Green) - 3:14   
 "Lazy Bones" (Hoagy Carmichael, Johnny Mercer) - 7:41   
 "Sunday" (Chester Conn, Benny Krueger) - 3:54   
 "Just Friends" (John Klenner, Sam M. Lewis) - 3:48   
 "All Of Me" (Gerald Marks, Seymour Simons) - 3:02   
 "Two Bad Days Blues" - 4:43   
 "It's You Or No One" (Jule Styne, Sammy Cahn) - 4:31   
 "Blue Smile" - 4:00  
Recorded in Los Angeles, California on December 21 (track 6 & 8) and December 23 (tracks 1-5 & 7), 1959

Personnel 
Sonny Stitt - alto saxophone
Lou Levy - piano
Leroy Vinnegar - bass
Mel Lewis - drums

References 

1961 albums
Verve Records albums
Sonny Stitt albums